Danielle Rose Melnick is a fictional character on the NBC crime drama Law & Order, portrayed by Tovah Feldshuh. She was featured on the show starting in 1991. (In Tovah Feldshuh's first Law & Order appearance in the 1991 episode "Aria", she plays a character very similar to Melnick but is a probate lawyer, not a litigator, and is unnamed.)

The character Melnick is a New York City–based defense attorney with a practice spanning more than 20 years. She is portrayed as a well-established, high-profile litigator, regularly going up against the toughest, most powerful prosecutors in the New York City District Attorney's office. Her role in the Law & Order universe has been as a foil for Ben Stone (Michael Moriarty) and Jack McCoy (Sam Waterston). She has had an affectionately competitive friendship with the latter since the early days of their careers.

The character Melnick is dedicated to her job and is often shown to be a thorn in the side of the DA's office. Much like the character McCoy, she is so zealous in her job that she will bend (but never break) trial laws to win a case, and sometimes risks being put in contempt of court for antagonizing a judge.

The series has revealed nothing about her personal life except that she is Jewish.

In the 2002 episode "Open Season," she is very nearly disbarred and murdered in a case where she is representing a white supremacist accused of murdering a defense attorney. Angered by an order placed by the trial judge on her client prohibiting him from getting/receiving mail, she passes along an address to one of the man's associates, assured that it would produce evidence that could clear him; unbeknownst to her, however, it is actually the address of one of the terrorist's intended targets, who is soon murdered. She is arrested and charged as an accessory. She is horrified by what her client has done but refuses to break attorney–client privilege, even if it means she will go to prison.

McCoy, reluctant to prosecute his old friend, ends up saving her by lying to the terrorist, telling him that Melnick had confessed to unwittingly helping him and that he would go to prison for life unless he admitted that she had not known what he was going to do with the information. Melnick is cleared of all charges but is shot soon after by one of her former client's followers. However, she recovers a few episodes later and returns to her practice.

In 2011, Melnick appeared in the Law & Order: Criminal Intent finale "To the Boy In the Blue Knit Cap" on June 26, now specializing in real estate law.

Feldshuh appeared in the inaugural episode of Chicago Justice, "Fake," on March 1, 2017, portraying Melnick as a judge.

References

Fictional American Jews
Television characters introduced in 1991
Fictional lawyers
Law & Order characters
Crossover characters in television
American female characters in television